Sir Harold Samuel Eaton Stevens KCIE, CSI, MC (29 November 1892 – 23 July 1969) was an Indian Civil Service officer and the last British Chief Secretary of the Bengal Presidency.

Career
Educated at George Heriot's School and the University of Edinburgh, Stevens joined the Indian Civil Service in 1920, rising to become Chief Secretary of Bengal in October 1944. He was knighted as a Knight Commander of the Order of the Indian Empire (KCIE) in the 1947 Birthday Honours list.

References

1892 births
1969 deaths
British people in colonial India
Indian civil servants
Indian Civil Service (British India) officers
Knights Commander of the Order of the Indian Empire
Companions of the Order of the Star of India
Recipients of the Military Cross
Royal Scots officers
British Army personnel of World War I
Alumni of the University of Edinburgh
Chevaliers of the Légion d'honneur